Sue Cook (née Orr; born 23 April 1958) is an Australian former racewalking athlete. She is a former world record holder in the 10 kilometres race walk and the 20 kilometres race walk. She competed six times at the IAAF World Race Walking Cup, taking bronze in 1983, and was selected for Australia for the 1987 World Championships in Athletics.

Cook grew up in a sporting family – her father was a veteran-category runner while her older sister Jenny represented Australia at the 1972 Summer Olympics and set a long-standing national record in the 1500 metres. Her nephew, Daniel McConnell, was later an Olympic cyclist.

A key figure in the early years of international women's walking, Cook took two titles at the IWF World Championships and was a six-time participant at the IAAF World Race Walking Cup. Her best finish at the latter event was a bronze medal at the first holding of the 10 kilometres race walk, finishing behind Xu Yongjiu and Natalya Sharipova. She also represented Australia at the 1987 World Championships in Athletics and 1987 IAAF World Indoor Championships.

Cook broke a series of world records which were later recognised by the International Association of Athletics Federations. She completed the 20 kilometres race walk in 1:41:42 hours in 1980 to knock over a minute and a half off the previous mark set by Thorill Gylder. Cook greatly advanced the sport by breaking the 20 km walk world record three further times, taking it down to 1:39:31 hours, 1:36:36 hours, and finally 1:36:23 hours in 1984. Her last record stood for only ten days at which point her national rival Sally Pierson bettered the time. Cook and Pierson also exchanged the 10 km walk world record, with Cook setting 46:28 minutes in 1980, Pierson going to 45:38 minutes in 1982, then Cook claiming it back with 45:32 minutes the following month.

She won thirteen national titles at the Australian Athletics Championships, taking wins from 3000 m up to the 20 km walk. She was also the 1982 winner of the 5000 metres walk at the AAA Championships and the 1983 winner of the 10 km walk at the Canadian Track and Field Championships.

International competitions

National titles
Australian Athletics Championships
3000 m walk: 1977
5000 m walk: 1978, 1980, 1981, 1984, 1985
10 km walk: 1977, 1979, 1980, 1981, 1982, 1983
20 km walk: 1990
AAA Championships
5000 m walk: 1982
Canadian Track and Field Championships
10 km walk: 1983

See also
List of Australian athletics champions (women)

References

External links

Living people
1958 births
Australian female racewalkers
World record setters in athletics (track and field)